Eagle Houston, also known as The Eagle, is a gay bar in Montrose, Houston, Texas. It is one of many unaffiliated gay bars in dozens of different cities using the "Eagle" name, and caters to the leather and bear subcultures.

History
The bar was forced to close in January 2016 due to a fire.

In 2016, a mural associated with Mary's was digitized and recreated at the Eagle.

The gay bar was the ninth most popular in the United States in 2018, according to Logo TV's NewNowNext.

Reception
The bar was named "Favorite Community Bar", "Favorite Men's Bar", "Favorite Place to Show Off Your Leather", and "Club or Restaurant with Best Happy Hour" by OutSmart "Gayest and Greatest" list in 2018. The Eagle was also a finalist in the "Favorite Place to Watch Male Dancers", "Favorite Bar to Shoot Pool", and "Club or Restaurant with Best Margarita" categories.

References

External links

 

2016 disestablishments in Texas
LGBT culture in Houston
LGBT nightclubs in Texas